Ricardo Rodríguez Gil Carcedo (born 25 September 1997), commonly known as Riki, is a Spanish footballer who plays as a midfielder for Albacete Balompié.

Club career
Born in Oviedo, Asturias, Ricky represented Real Oviedo and Astur CF as a youth. He made his senior debut with the former's reserves during the 2015–16 campaign, in the Tercera División.

Riki subsequently served loan stints at CD Tineo and Marino de Luanco before joining Segunda División B side UP Langreo on a permanent deal on 11 July 2018.

In February 2019, Riki agreed a pre-contract with former side Oviedo, effective as of 1 July; he was initially assigned back at the B-team, now in the third division. He made his first team debut on 18 August, coming on as a late substitute for Alfredo Ortuño in a 2–3 away loss against Deportivo de La Coruña in the Segunda División.

Riki was definitely promoted to the main squad for the 2020–21 campaign, but moved out on loan to third division side Racing de Santander on 22 January 2021. On 24 July, he moved to Burgos CF in the second tier, on a one-year loan deal.

References

External links

1997 births
Living people
Footballers from Oviedo
Spanish footballers
Association football midfielders
Segunda División players
Segunda División B players
Tercera División players
Real Oviedo Vetusta players
Marino de Luanco footballers
UP Langreo footballers
Real Oviedo players
Racing de Santander players
Burgos CF footballers
Albacete Balompié players